1977 Shura, provisional designation , is a stony asteroid from the middle region of the asteroid belt, approximately 16 kilometers in diameter. It was discovered on 30 August 1970, by Russian astronomer Tamara Smirnova at the Crimean Astrophysical Observatory, Nauchnyj, on the Crimean peninsula. The asteroid was named for Soviet Aleksandr Kosmodemyansky.

Orbit and classification 

Shura orbits the Sun in the central main-belt at a distance of 2.6–3.0 AU once every 4 years and 8 months (1,694 days). Its orbit has an eccentricity of 0.07 and an inclination of 8° with respect to the ecliptic.

The first used observation was a precovery taken at Goethe Link Observatory in 1954, extending the body's observation arc by 16 years prior to its official discovery observation at Nauchnyj.

Physical characteristics

Rotation period 

A rotational lightcurve was obtained from photometric measurements made at the Australian Oakley Southern Sky Observatory in March 2010. It gave a well-defined rotation period of  hours with a brightness amplitude of 0.34 in magnitude.

Diameter and albedo 

According to the space-based surveys carried out by the Japanese Akari satellite and the NEOWISE mission of NASA's Wide-field Infrared Survey Explorer, the asteroid measures 16.3 and 18.5 kilometers in diameter, respectively, and its surface has a corresponding albedo of 0.19 and 0.13. The Collaborative Asteroid Lightcurve Link (CALL) assumes a standard albedo for stony asteroids of 0.20 and calculates a diameter of 14.9 kilometers.

Between 2005 and 2022, 1977 Shura has been observed to occult three stars.

Spectral type 

CALL characterizes Shura as a stony S-type asteroid. In the SMASS taxonomic scheme, it is classified as a transitional Sq-subtype to the elusive Q-type asteroids of the main-belt. Shura is also characterized as a carbonaceous C-type asteroid by Pan-STARRS photometric survey.

Naming 

This minor planet was named after Aleksandr Kosmodemyansky (1925–1945), Hero of the Soviet Union, who died at the age of 19 during the German-Soviet War, shortly after the Battle of Königsberg. "Shura" is a pet name for Aleksandr. The minor planets 1793 Zoya and 2072 Kosmodemyanskaya were named in honor of his sister and mother, respectively. The official  was published by the Minor Planet Center on 30 June 1977.

References

External links 
 Asteroid Lightcurve Database (LCDB), query form (info )
 Dictionary of Minor Planet Names, Google books
 Asteroids and comets rotation curves, CdR – Observatoire de Genève, Raoul Behrend
 Discovery Circumstances: Numbered Minor Planets (1)-(5000) – Minor Planet Center
 
 

 

001977
Discoveries by Tamara Mikhaylovna Smirnova
Named minor planets
001977
19700830